Horní Planá is a town in Český Krumlov District in the South Bohemian Region of the Czech Republic. It has about 2,000 inhabitants.

Administrative parts
Villages of Bližší Lhota, Hodňov, Hory, Hůrka, Olšina, Pernek and Žlábek are administrative parts of Horní Planá.

Geography

It lies on the border with Austria.

Horní Planá is situated in the Bohemian Forest on the southeastern rim of the Šumava National Park, in the Šumava Protected Landscape Area.

Horní Planá is located on the northern shore of the Lipno Reservoir, south of the Boletice Military Training Area. Tajvan, the largest island of the reservoir, is located in the territory. Beyond the Lipno Reservoir, a densely forested area with several abandoned villages stretches up to the Vltava-Danube drainage divide (part of the main European Watershed).

History
Horní Planá was founded by monks from the Zlatá Koruna Monastery in the first half of the 14th century. In 1349, it was promoted to a market town by King Charles IV.

During the Hussite Wars in 1420, it was incorporated into the Český Krumlov estate, then held by the Rosenberg family. The Rosenbergs insignia were adopted in the town's coat of arms. The good location on the trade route from Bohemia to Austria and later the construction of the Schwarzenberg Canal and the railway had a significant influence on the town's development.

Horní Planá was originally known under its German names Plan and Plana, and from 1653 Oberplan and Ober Plan. Since 1921, the town has its Czech name Horní Planá.

Until 1945 the local population predominantly consisted of Sudeten Germans. In 1930, they made 98% of the population. In 1938, the town was annexed by Nazi Germany upon the 1938 Munich Agreement and incorporated into the Reichsgau Oberdonau. After World War II, it was restored to Czechoslovakia, while the remaining German population was expelled.

Demographics

Transport
There is the Zadní Zvonková/Schöneben road border crossing.

Sights

The main landmark is the Church of Saint Margaret the Virgin. Its existence is first documented in 1374. It was later rebuilt in Neo-Gothic style and has preserved Renaissance murals from 1530–1580.

The birth house of Adalbert Stifter houses today a museum dedicated to his life and work. There is also a park named after Stifter with his monument.

On the town square there is the Neo-Baroque town hall from 1896.

Notable people
Adolf Martin Pleischl (1787–1867), chemist and medical doctor
Adalbert Stifter (1805–1868), writer, poet and painter
Leopold Wackarž (1810–1901), Cistercian abbot general

Twin towns – sister cities

Horní Planá is twinned with:
 Ulrichsberg, Austria

References

External links

Cities and towns in the Czech Republic
Populated places in Český Krumlov District
Bohemian Forest